Nordland Arbeiderblad was a Norwegian newspaper, published in Narvik in Nordland county.

Nordland Arbeiderblad was started in October 1931 as the Communist Party of Norway organ in the vicinity. It was published twice a week. It was not issued during the German occupation of Norway from 1940 to 1945, more specifically after August 1940 when the Communist Party was outlawed. The newspaper resurfaced in July 1945, and lasted until October 1958. Before its demise, it was the third last of the Communist Party newspapers, leaving only Friheten and Ny Tid.

Editors-in-chief include Gotfred Johan Hølvold from 1934 to 1936 and Erling Bentzen from 1949 to 1952.

References

1931 establishments in Norway
1958 disestablishments in Norway
Communist Party of Norway newspapers
Defunct newspapers published in Norway
Narvik
Mass media in Nordland
Norwegian-language newspapers
Publications established in 1931
Publications disestablished in 1940
Newspapers established in 1945
Publications disestablished in 1958